Minu may refer to:
Minu Island, Khuzestan province, southwestern Iran
Minu District, an administrative subdivision of Iran
Minu, Lorestan, a village in Lorestan Province, Iran
Minu-Sepehr Aerospace University, Los Angeles, California, United States
Min-woo, Korean masculine given name transcribed as "Minu" in standard romanisation
-minu (born 1947), pen name of Swiss newspaper columnist Hans-Peter Hammel
Minal "Minu" Panchal, one of the victims of the Virginia Tech Massacre
 Minu, a Genie Fairy in Shimmer and Shine
Minod Moktan, human rights activist